The ACB Most Valuable Player Award is an annual award of the Liga ACB, the top-tier professional basketball league in Spain. The ACB handed out the award first after the 1991–92 ACB season. Since then, four players have won the award more than once: Darryl Middleton (3-time winner), Arvydas Sabonis, Tanoka Beard, and Luis Scola (2-time winners). Additionally, only six Spanish players have won the award: Juan Carlos Navarro, Marc Gasol, Felipe Reyes, Fernando San Emeterio, Sergio Llull and naturalized Spanish player Nikola Mirotić. The winner of the award is determined by voting by coaches, players, fans (through online voting), and the media.

All-time award winners

Awards won by club

Awards won by nationality

See also
ACB Finals Most Valuable Player Award
All-ACB Team
ACB Rising Star Award

References

External links
Spanish League Official Website 

      
Liga ACB awards
Basketball most valuable player awards